The Old Town station is a Staten Island Railway station in the neighborhood of Old Town, Staten Island, New York.

History 
The station opened toward the beginning of 1937, likely during a grade crossing elimination project. The original name of the station was "Old Town Road"; the "Road" was dropped soon after the Metropolitan Transportation Authority assumed control of the Staten Island Railway from the Baltimore and Ohio Railroad in 1971 (the MTA concurrently shortened the name of the Huguenot Park station to simply "Huguenot").

Station layout

The station is located on an embankment at Railroad Avenue on the main line. It has two side platforms, and metal orange canopies and walls. Just north of this station, a spur that had multiple purposes and served the press building of the Staten Island Advance newspaper is nowadays used as a storage spur for ballast cars.

Exits
The exit at the south end leads to Old Town Road. An additional staircase at the north end of the northbound platform leads to a roadway to Dawson Place and Oregon Road.

References

External links

Staten Island Railway station list
Staten Island Railway general information
 Old Town Road entrance from Google Maps Street View
 Platforms from Google Maps Street View

1937 establishments in New York City
Railway stations in the United States opened in 1937
Staten Island Railway stations